John Charles Melliss (23 January 1835 – 23 August 1910) was a British engineer and amateur naturalist.

Details

He was born on the island of St Helena in the South Atlantic Ocean. His father, Lieutenant G.W. Melliss, was an officer of the St Helena Artillery. After training as an engineer, and serving as an officer in the Royal Engineers, he was appointed as government surveyor in St Helena from 1860 to 1871. In 1871, because of government cutbacks, he was made redundant and returned to London, where he subsequently formed the firm of J.C. Melliss and Co.

In 1875, he published the book for which he is best known: St. Helena: A Physical, Historical and Topographical Description of the Island, Including the Geology, Fauna, Flora and Meteorology. It was illustrated by his wife, Alice Elizabeth Louisa, née Stace, who was credited on the title page as "Mrs. J. C. Melliss", and on plates as "A. Melliss".

To commemorate the book's centenary in 1975, the St. Helena Post Office published a set of four stamps, using illustrations from the book.

Recognition 
Joseph Dalton Hooker named the monotypic plant genus Mellissia in his honour. It was subsequently  subsumed into the genus Withania.

The Silver Eel (Ariosoma mellissii), also known as the Melliss's Conger was named for him by Albert Gunther.

Family

The Melliss's son, H.J. Melliss, joined his father's company (later named Melliss and Partners following a partnership with H.R. Smart). He worked for the company until 1955.

References

External links

St. Helena: A Physical, Historical and Topographical Description of the Island, Including the Geology, Fauna, Flora and Meteorology by Melliss, through the Biodiversity Heritage Library

1835 births
1911 deaths
History of Saint Helena
Royal Engineers officers
British naturalists
Saint Helenian people of British descent